Dušan Lajović was the defending champion, but competed in the 2014 Aegon Championships instead.

Pablo Carreño Busta won the title, defeating Facundo Bagnis in the final, 4–6, 6–4, 6–1.

Seeds

  Pablo Carreño Busta (champion)
  Pablo Andújar (quarterfinals)
  Pere Riba (second round, retired)
  Filippo Volandri (second round)
  Albert Ramos (first round)
  Malek Jaziri (first round, retired)
  Pablo Cuevas (quarterfinals)
  Facundo Bagnis (final)

Draw

Finals

Top half

Bottom half

References
 Main Draw
 Qualifying Draw

Citta di Caltanissettaandnbsp;- Singles
2014 Singles